Kelechi Emeteole (1951 – 21 June 2017) was a Nigerian football player and coach. He was part of the Nigeria national team in the 1976 African Cup of Nations hosted at Ethiopia. Throughout his career, he had been coach of various teams like Heartland F.C., Enugu Rangers, El-Kanemi Warriors F.C. and the national beach soccer team.

Playing career 
Emeteole played 17 matches for the Nigeria football team scoring four goals  from 1975 to 1977. He was part of the squad at the 1976 African Cup of Nations where Nigeria won bronze medal. He was popularly called as 'Caterpillar' for his "rugged defensive style".

Coaching career 
Emeteole was assistant coach of the Super Eagles team and head coach of the Heartland F.C., Enugu Rangers, El-Kanemi Warriors F.C. and the national beach soccer team. He coached the beach soccer team, known as Super Sand Eagles from 2007 to 2009. While he was coach of the Iwuanyanwu Nationale (now called Heartland FC) in 2009, the team reached the CAF Champions League finals. In April 2017, angry mob had attacked Emeteole, who was then coach of the team Enugu Rangers, after they had lost a match. He was sacked as coach in May 2015 where he was in charge for three months. He was hired as coach by El-Kanemi Warriors of Maiduguri in August 2015.

Health issues and death 
Emeteole reported loss of voice after the last match between El Kanemi Warriors and Heartland Football Club of Owerri in December 2015. He had faced similar issues before. In January 2016 the [[Federal government of the United States|Federal]] Medical Centre, Owerri conducted biopsy but diagnosed it to be infection. In October 2016 he was diagnosed of throat cancer at the Lagos University Teaching Hospital. For his treatment in India, he reportedly needed  11,000. He received financial helps from the Nigeria Soccer Federation-United States of America (NSF-USA), Imo Foundation, Super Eagles defender Kenneth Omeruo, and politician Ugonna Ozurigbo for his treatment.

Emeteole had been in India for the surgery but died on 21 June 2017 at the hospital in New Delhi at the age of 66 while still being under treatment. He had developed complications in breathing and was survived by his wife Lolo Emeteole.

References 

1951 births
2017 deaths
Nigerian footballers
Nigeria international footballers
Nigerian football managers
1976 African Cup of Nations players
Deaths from cancer in Nigeria
Deaths from throat cancer
Association football forwards